Ilmar Sikemäe (born as Helmut Bötker; 18 December 1914 Albu Parish, Järva County – 25 July 1998) was an Estonian writer.

1953–1957, he was the chief editor for the magazine Looming.

1945–1990, he was a member of CPSU.

His major work was the collection of sketches Kirjad Vargamäelt ('Letters from Vargamäe'), published in 1962.

Works
 prose "Teekond jätkub". Tallinn: Eesti Riiklik Kirjastus, 1951
 prose "Näoga tuleviku poole". Tallinn: Eesti Riiklik Kirjastus, 1961
 collection of sketches "Kirjad Vargamäelt." Tallinn: Eesti Riiklik Kirjastus, 1962
 prose "Selged silmad". Tallinn: Eesti Raamat, 1967
 prose "Sada lugu". Tallinn: Eesti Raamat, 1969
 prose "Selged silmad". Tallinn: Eesti Raamat, 1984
 prose "Vasaku käe lood". Tallinn: Eesti Raamat, 1989

References

1914 births
1998 deaths
Estonian male short story writers
20th-century Estonian writers
Estonian editors
Estonian magazine editors
People from Järva Parish
Burials at Metsakalmistu
Looming (magazine) editors
Soviet writers